Nikolai Petrovich Ostroumov (1846–1930) was an imperial Russian orientalist, ethnographer and educationalist in Turkestan.

He studied under Nikolai Il'minskii at the Kazan Theological Seminary, where he studied Arabic and Turkic languages as well as Islam.

He was editor of Turkistan Wilayatining Gazeti from 1883 to 1917.

References

Russian educators
Turkestan
1846 births
1930 deaths